Kelly McKerihen (born 5 May 1986) is a Canadian International lawn bowler.

Biography
In 2007, McKerihen won the triples and fours bronze medals at the Atlantic Bowls Championships.

She won a bronze medal in the Women's singles at the 2012 World Outdoor Bowls Championship in Adelaide. Four years later in 2016, she won a bronze medal at the 2016 World Outdoor Bowls Championship in Christchurch in the singles.

In November 2017, McKerihen was named to Canada's 2018 Commonwealth Games team.  

In 2020, she was selected for the 2020 World Outdoor Bowls Championship in Australia. In 2022, she competed in the women's triples and the Women's fours at the 2022 Commonwealth Games.

Personal life
Her father is Steve McKerihen.

References

External links
 Kelly McKerihen at Bowls Canada
 
 

1986 births
Living people
Canadian female bowls players
Commonwealth Games competitors for Canada
Bowls players at the 2014 Commonwealth Games
Bowls players at the 2018 Commonwealth Games
Bowls players at the 2022 Commonwealth Games
Sportspeople from Toronto
21st-century Canadian women